Greetham with Somersby is a civil parish in the East Lindsey district of Lincolnshire, England.

The parish comprises the villages of Greetham, Somersby, Ashby Puerorum, Bag Enderby and the  hamlet of Holbeck.

Greetham with Somersby is crossed by no major roads, although the A158 Lincoln to Skegness road forms part of the southern parish boundary. Two small streams flow eastward into the River Lymn which flows south-eastwards through the east of the parish.

The 2001 Census recorded a Greetham with Somersby population of 161, including Ashby Puerorum and increasing to 167 at the 2011 Census.

Community politics is in the hand of a Parish meeting.

References
Citations

Bibliography

External links

Civil parishes in Lincolnshire
East Lindsey District